Leckie Range may refer to:
 Leckie Range, Antarctica
 Leckie Range, Canada